Rutherford is a small lunar impact crater that lies on the Moon's far side. It was named after New Zealand-British physicist and Nobel laureate Ernest Rutherford. It is located just to the north-northwest of the huge walled plain Mendeleev. To the east of Rutherford is the equally diminutive crater Glauber, and to the west-northwest lies Hoffmeister.

This crater has a roughly pear-shaped outline, with an elongated section at the north-northwestern end. The rim edge is well-defined and the inner walls are simple slopes that run down to the small interior floor.

References

External links

 LTO-66A3 Rutherford — L&PI topographic map

Impact craters on the Moon